Athletes, coaches, and journalists who have been inducted into the North Carolina Sports Hall of Fame.



A
Charlie Adams 
Skip Alexander
Johnny Allen
Maxine Allen
Donna Andrews
Debbie Antonelli
Herb Appenzeller
Luke Appling
Missouri Arledge
Gerald Austin
Dugan Aycock

B
Elzie "Buck" Baker
Dr. Lenox Baker
John Baker, Jr.
Scott Bankhead
George Barclay
Frank Barger
Billy Ray Barnes
Ernie Barnes
Ronnie Barnes
Smith Barrier
Bob Bartholomew
Glenn Bass
Genia Beasley
Jim Beatty
Bobby Bell
Peggy Kirk Bell
Walt Bellamy
Connie Mack Berry
Elvin Bethea 
Henry Bibby
Eddie Biedenbach
Furman Bisher
Russell Blunt
Muggsy Bogues
Jeff Bostic
Joe Bostic
Willie Bradshaw
Pete Brennan
Cary Brewbaker
Eddie Bridges
Rod Brind'Amour
Dave Bristol
Rod Broadway
Leon Brogden
Bill Brooks
Dan Brooks
Hal Brown
Mack Brown
Ted Brown
Wilt Browning
Charlie Bryant
Kelvin Bryant
Vic Bubas
Al Buehler
Willie Burden
Forrest "Smokey" Burgess
Tommy Burleson
Marge Burns
Tom Butters
Dennis Byrd
Tommy Byrne

C
Mike Caldwell
Eddie Cameron
Chris Cammack
Wray Carlton
A. J. Carr
M.L. Carr
Gordon Carver
Everett Case
Willis Casey
Peggy Pate Chappell
Joey Cheek
Castleman D. Chesley
Wes Chesson
Joe Cheves
Richard Childress
Jimmy Clack
Dwight Clark
George Clark
Wilburn Clary
Tony Cloninger
John Clougherty
Jack Cobb
Whit Cobb
Bob Colvin
Freddie Combs
Jack Coombs
Gene Corrigan
Billy Cox
Dennis Craddock
Roger Craig
Fred Crawford
Alvin Crowder
Carlester Crumpler

D
Brad Daugherty
Tom Davis
Walter Davis
Randy Denton
John Derr
Prince Nufer Dixon
Bill Dooley
Jim Donnan
Anson Dorrance
Al Dowtin
Jim Duncan
Laura DuPont
Dwight Durante
Woody Durham

E
Dale Earnhardt
Dale Earnhardt Jr.
Earle Edwards
Carl Eller
Chuck Erickson
Sam Esposito
Bill Eutsler

F
Joe Ferebee
Rick Ferrell
Wes Ferrell
Bob Fetzer
Mindy Ballou Fitzpatrick
Darrell Floyd
Sleepy Floyd
Raymond Floyd
Peter Fogarassy
Phil Ford
David Fox
Mike Fox
Skeeter Francis
Ron Francis
Russ Frazier
Rabbit Fulghum
Eunies Futch

G
Roman Gabriel
Steve Gabriel
Clarence "Bighouse" Gaines
Bob Gantt
Mary Garber
Wade Garrett
Jim Garrison
Paul Gay
Betty Springs Geiger
Claude Gibson
Lee Gliarmis
Mike Gminski
Billy Goodman
Murray Greason
Ron Green, Sr.
Bill Guthridge

H
Jesse Haddock
Ellis "Dumpy" Hagler
Marshall Happer
Dee Hardison
Bob Harris
Dave Harris
Leo Hart
Charlie Harville
Sylvia Hatchell
H. C. "Joby" Hawn
Bill Hayes
Clayton Heafner
Bunn Hearn
Tommy Helms
Dickie Hemric
Rick Hendrick
Bill Hensley
Dick Herbert
Dan Hill
Bobby Hodges
Terry Holland
Jack Holley
Torry Holt
Gene Hooks
Babe Howell
Lou Hudson
Ken Huff
Jim "Catfish" Hunter

I
Cal Irvin

J
Carl James
Bob Jamieson
Antawn Jamison
Dale Jarrett
Ned Jarrett
Haywood Jeffires
Jack Jensen
Freddy Johnson
Robert Glenn "Junior" Johnson
Bobby Jones
Charlie Jones
Lenora Jones
Paul Jones
Sam Jones
Steve Jones
Eckie Jordan
Michael Jordan
Christian "Sonny" Jurgensen
Charlie "Choo Choo" Justice

K
Dee Kantner
Charles Kernodle Jr.
Clyde King
Jack King
Marion Kirby
Gordon "Chubby" Kirkland
Mike Krzyzewski

L
Max Lanier
Luther Lassiter
Page Marsh Lea
Meadowlark Lemon
Walter "Buck" Leonard
John "Buddy" Lewis
Larry Lindsey
Gene Littles
Carroll "Whitey" Lockman
Henry Logan
Davis Love III
John Lucas
James Lytle

M
Johnny Mackorell
Glenn E.(Ted) Mann
Jack Marin
Page Marsh
Mike Martin
Bob Matheson
Cedric Maxwell
Jakie May
Bob McAdoo
George McAfee
Fred McCall
Don McCauley
Dr. Angus "Monk" McDonald
Jack McDowall
Jerry McGee
Jerry McGee
Mike McGee
Neill McGeachy
Rich McGeorge
Jack McKeon
Horace "Bones" McKinney
John McLendon
Kathy McMillan
Henry Lee "Spec" Meadows
Chasity Melvin
Paul Miller
Jim Mills
Sam Mills
Sam Moir
Vic Molodet
Jerry Moore
Dale Morey
Allen Morris
Mac Morris
Hugh Morton
John Henry Moss
Jeff Mullins
Jack Murdock
Bill Murray

N
Fred "Curly" Neal
Timmy Newsome
Trot Nixon

O
John "Red" O’Quinn
Dave Odom
Carla Overbeck
Gene Overby
Thell Overman
Kristi Overton Johnson

P
Billy Packer
Estelle Lawson Page
Arnold Palmer
Johnny Palmer
Tom Parham
Ace Parker
Billy Joe Patton
Add Penfield
Julius Peppers
Gaylord Perry
Jim Perry
Lindsay J. "Hap" Perry
Lee Petty
Richard Petty
Pat Preston
Ray Price
Al Proctor
Rick Proehl
Lou Pucillo
Jethro Pugh
Bobby Purcell

Q
Mike Quick
Bob Quincy

R
Walter Rabb
Sam Ranzino
Lenox Rawlings
Ray Reeve
Harvey Reid Jr.
Steve Rerych
Jerry Richardson
Herman Riddick
Jim Ritcher
Dave Robbins
Oliver "Bo" Roddey Jr.
Francis Rogalio
Rodney Rogers
Judy Rose
Lennie Rosenbluth
Donald Ross

S
Charlie Sanders
Lee Shaffer
Joel Shankle
Ronnie Shavlik
Julie Shea-Graw
Marty Sheets
Karen Shelton
Wallace Shelton
Ernie Shore
Charlie Sifford
Dave Sime
Tony Simeon
Floyd "Chunk" Simmons
Paul Simson
Enos "Country" Slaughter
Norm Sloan
Irwin Smallwood
Belus Smawley
Charlotte Smith
Dean Smith
Earl Smith
Vic Sorrell
Mildred Southern
Jack Stallings
Clarence Stasavich
Jim Staton
Jerry Steele
Tim Stevens
Andrea Stinson
Lee Stone
Tom Suiter
Ben Sutton
Ed Sutton
John Swofford
Paul Sykes

T
Danny Talbott
Simon Terrell
Herb Thomas
David Thompson
Jerry Tolley
Henry Trevathan
Caulton Tudor
Richard Tufts

V
Steve Vacendak
Jim Valvano
Bobby Vaughn

W
Jake Wade
Wallace Wade
Tony Waldrop
Peahead Walker
LeRoy Walker
Michael Gerard "Mickey" Walsh
Susan Walsh
Harvie Ward
Bob Waters
Roger Watson
Jim Weaver
Frank Weedon
Art Weiner
Joe West
Humpy Wheeler
Stephanie Wheeler
Alan White
Burgess Whitehead
George Whitfield
Fred Whitfield
Hoyt Wilhelm
Doug Wilkerson
Charles "Buck" Williams
George Williams
Roy Williams
Harry Williamson
Shirley Wilson
Donnell Woolford
James Worthy
Taft Wright

Y
Floyd "Pep" Young
Kay Yow
Susan Yow
Virgil Yow
Deborah A. Yow-Bowden

Z
Jonathan Thompson "Tom" Zachary

See also
North Carolina Sports Hall of Fame

References

External links
NC Sports Hall of Fame website

Lists of American sportspeople
 
Sports hall of fame inductees
Hall of Fame